Paretroplus menarambo (pinstripe menarambo or pinstripe damba) is a species of cichlid fish.

It is threatened by invasive species and over-fishing. It is part of a captive breeding program by public institutions like London Zoo and Bolton Museum and among fishkeeping hobbyists.

Description
The pinstripe menarambo is a relatively deep-bodied Paretroplus that reaches  in length. Body is very laterally compressed. The coloration is brown-gray with  vertical darker bands. The fins are gray with reddish-brown border. The tail fin is crescent-shaped.

Distribution
This species is present in the floodplain lakes in the Sofia River system in northwestern Madagascar. It was formerly classified as extinct in the wild by the IUCN, but a remnant population has recently been discovered in Lake Tseny. The same lake also has populations of the related P. kieneri and P. lamenabe, and the round herring Sauvagella robusta.

Bibliography

 Andriafidison D et al., Preliminary fish survey of Lac Tseny in northwestern Madagascar in Madagascar Conservation & Development, vol. 6, nº 2, 2011, p. 83
 Axelrod, H. R., 1993. The most complete colored lexicon of cichlids. T.F.H. Publications, Neptune City USA.
 Goldstein, R.J.: Cichlids of the world.T.F.H. Publications Inc. Neptune City, New Jersey, USA. Any 1988.
 Helfman, G., B. Collette i D. Facey: The diversity of fishes. Blackwell Science, Malden, Massachusetts USA, 1997.
 Moyle, P. i J. Cech.: Fishes: An Introduction to Ichthyology, 4a. edició, Upper Saddle River, New Jersey, USA: Prentice-Hall. Any 2000.
 Nelson, J.: Fishes of the World, 3a. ed. New York, USA: John Wiley and Sons. Any 1994.
 Poll, M. & J.P. Gosse 1995: Genera des poissons d'eau douce de l'Afrique. Mémoire de la Classe des Sciences. Académie royale de Belgique. 9: 1–324.
 Römer U.: Cichliden Atlas, Bd. 1. Melle. 1311 p. Any 1998.
 Sparks, J. 2008. Phylogeny of the cichlid subfamily Etroplinae and taxonomic revision of the malagasy cichlid genus Paretroplus (Teleostei: Cichlidae). Bulletin of the American museum of Natural history, 314: 1–151.
 Wheeler, A.: The World Encyclopedia of Fishes, 2nd. Ed., London: Macdonald. Any 1985.

References

menarambo
Fish described in 1966
Freshwater fish of Madagascar
Taxonomy articles created by Polbot